Pádraig Ó Tuama is an Irish poet, theologian and conflict mediator.

Early life and education 
Ó Tuama was brought up in a Catholic family in County Cork, Ireland. His first language is English. He also speaks Irish. Ó Tuama received his Bachelor of Arts in Divinity from the Maryvale Institute of Birmingham, England and his Master's of Theology from Queen's University Belfast.

Career 
Ó Tuama has written three collections of poetry and a book of spiritual reflection. His poetry has been featured in Harvard Review, RTÉ’s Poem of the Week, Poetry Ireland, New England Review, The Kenyon Review and the Academy of American Poets' Poem-A-Day. He has held numerous poetry residencies, most recently with The Church of the Heavenly Rest in New York City, and the Morton Deutsch International Center for Cooperation and Conflict Resolution at Columbia University. He was profiled in the New Yorker in December 2022.

Ó Tuama is a staff poet with the On Being Project, and hosts Poetry Unbound, a podcast produced by On Being Studios. Poetry Unbound had been  downloaded more than 10 million times by the end of 2022. Ó Tuama's book Poetry Unbound: 50 Poems to Open your World, an anthology based on the podcast of the same name, was published by Canongate and W.W. Norton in 2022.

Ó Tuama has featured on Thought for the Day on BBC Radio 4, BBC Radio Scotland and BBC Radio Ulster. He has presented Something Understood on BBC Radio 4, and An Saol Ó Dheas on RTÉ. In 2021, he hosted the first season of The Corrymeela Podcast, and an episode of On Being with Krista Tippett. His interviewees have included Hanif Abdurraqib, The Edge, Mary McAleese, Martin Hayes, Billy Collins and Joy Harjo.

In 2011, along with Paul Doran, Ó Tuama co-founded Tenx9, a storytelling initiative based in Belfast. Tenx9 events have since been held in Nashville and Melbourne.

From 2014 to 2019, Ó Tuama was the leader of the Corrymeela Community, Ireland's oldest peace and reconciliation organisation. He has also collaborated with and worked for a number of other mediation organisations, including Co-operation Ireland, Mediation Northern Ireland, and Place for Hope. He is a frequent speaker at Greenbelt Festival.

Personal life 
Ó Tuama is gay, and has been a vocal supporter of the legalisation of same-sex marriage. He has been outspoken against the practice of ‘reparative’ or ‘conversion therapy’.

Published works 

 Feed the Beast (Broken Sleep Books, 2022) ISBN 978-1-915079-52-7 
 Poetry Unbound: 50 Poems to Open Your World (Canongate and W. W. Norton, 2022) 
In the Shelter: Finding a Home in the World (North America edition, with foreword by Krista Tippett, Broadleaf Books, 2021) 
Borders and Belonging. The Book of Ruth: A Story for Our Times (Co-authored with Glenn Jordan, Canterbury Press, 2021) 
15 sonnets in When Did We See You Naked (Reaves and Tombs [eds], SCM Press, 2021) 
Four poems in Mapping Faith: Theologies of Migration and Community (Lia Shimada [ed], Jessica Kingsley Publishers, 2020) 
'The Place Between' in Neither Here nor There: The Many Voices of Liminality (Timothy Carson [ed], The Lutterworth Press, 2019) 
Daily Prayer with the Corrymeela Community (Canterbury Press, 2017) 
 In the Shelter: Finding a Home in the World (Hodder & Stoughton, 2015) 
 Sorry for Your Troubles (Canterbury Press, 2013) 
 Readings from the Books of Exile (Canterbury Press, 2012)

References

External links 
Ó Tuama's official website

 

Irish poets
21st-century Irish poets
Year of birth missing (living people)
Living people
Alumni of Queen's University Belfast
Poetry anthologies
Podcasting
Columbia University
Irish theologians